The punji stick or punji stake is a type of booby trapped stake. It is a simple spike, made out of wood or bamboo, which is sharpened, heated, and usually set in a hole. Punji sticks are usually deployed in substantial numbers. The Oxford English Dictionary (third edition, 2007) lists less frequent, earlier spellings for "punji stake (or stick)": panja, panjee, panjie, panji, and punge.

Description

Punji sticks would be placed in areas likely to be passed through by enemy troops. The presence of punji sticks may be camouflaged by natural undergrowth, crops, grass, brush or similar materials. They were often incorporated into various types of traps; for example, a camouflaged pit into which a soldier might fall (it would then be a trou de loup).

Sometimes a pit would be dug with punji sticks in the sides pointing downward at an angle. A soldier stepping into the pit would find it impossible to remove their leg without doing severe damage, and injuries might be incurred by the simple act of falling forward while one's leg is in a narrow, vertical, stake-lined pit. Such pits would require time and care to dig the soldier's leg out, immobilizing the unit longer than if the foot were simply pierced, in which case the victim could be evacuated by  stretcher or firefighter's carry if necessary.

Other additional measures include coating the sticks in poison from plants, animal venom, or even human feces, causing infection or poisoning in the victim after being pierced by the sticks, even if the injury itself was not life-threatening.

Punji sticks were sometimes deployed in the preparation of an ambush. Soldiers lying in wait for the enemy to pass would deploy punji sticks in the areas where the surprised enemy might be expected to take cover, resulting in soldiers diving for cover potentially impaling themselves.

The point of penetration was usually in the foot or lower leg area. Punji sticks were not necessarily meant to kill the person who stepped on them; rather, they were sometimes designed specifically to only wound the enemy and slow or halt their unit while the victim was evacuated to a medical facility.

Vietnam War
In the Vietnam War, this method was used to force the wounded soldier to be transported by helicopter to a medical hospital for treatment.

Punji sticks were also used in Vietnam to complement various defenses, such as barbed wire.

Etymology
The term first appeared in the English language in the 1870s, after the British Indian Army encountered the sticks in their border conflicts against the Kachins of north east Burma (and it is from the Tibeto-Burman language that this word probably originated).

See also

NLF and PAVN strategy, organization and structure
NLF and PAVN logistics and equipment
NLF and PAVN battle tactics

References

Area denial weapons
Primitive weapons
Guerrilla warfare tactics